Acentric may refer to:

 Acentric factor, in thermodynamics, the measure of the non-sphericity (acentricity) of molecules
 Acentric chromosome, in genetics, a chromosome without centromere
 Acentric fragment, in genetics, a chromosome segment lacking a centromere

See also 
 Eccentricity (disambiguation)